The canton of Saint-Bonnet-en-Champsaur is an administrative division in southeastern France. At the French canton reorganisation which came into effect in March 2015, the canton was expanded from 16 to 27 communes (3 of which merged into the new commune Aubessagne):
 
Ancelle
Aspres-lès-Corps
Aubessagne
Buissard
Chabottes
Champoléon
La Chapelle-en-Valgaudémar
La Fare-en-Champsaur
Forest-Saint-Julien
Le Glaizil
Laye
La Motte-en-Champsaur
Le Noyer
Orcières
Poligny
Saint-Bonnet-en-Champsaur
Saint-Firmin
Saint-Jacques-en-Valgodemard
Saint-Jean-Saint-Nicolas
Saint-Julien-en-Champsaur
Saint-Laurent-du-Cros
Saint-Léger-les-Mélèzes
Saint-Maurice-en-Valgodemard
Saint-Michel-de-Chaillol  
Villar-Loubière

Demographics

See also
Cantons of the Hautes-Alpes department 
Communes of France

References

Cantons of Hautes-Alpes